Sean Jerguson (born February 3, 1972) is an American politician who served in the Georgia House of Representatives from the 22nd district from 2007 to 2012.

Jerguson has served as Mayor of Holly Springs, and Mayor Pro-Tempore of the Holly Springs City Council.

He is a graduate of the Coverdell Leadership Institute and the Regional Leadership Institute.

References

1972 births
Living people
Republican Party members of the Georgia House of Representatives